Stiburus is a genus of plants in the family Poaceae.

Species

References

External links

Chloridoideae
Poaceae genera